

Temples
 Ernakulam Shiva Temple  Ernakulathapan temple (Shiva), Hanuman Temple, Muruga Temple.  Located near Ernakulam South Railway Station (2 km ) 
Valanjambalam Devi Temple (0.5 km from Ernakulam South Railway Station),
Ravipuram Srikrishna Swamy Temple (1 km from Ernakulam South Railway Station)
Pavakkulam Mahadeva Temple (0.5 km from Ernakulam north Railway Station)
Paramara Devi Temple (Opposite Town Hall, and near Ernakulam Town Railway Station)
Sree Poornathrayeesa Temple, Thrippunithura
Thottathingal DhramaSastha Temple (SRM Road/Sastha Temple Road, near Platform no.2 of Ernakulam Town Railway Station)
Kaattungal Devi Temple (Start point of Pachalam Railway Over Bridge, Pachalam)
Shanmughapuram Temple (Shanmugha Puram Road, Pachalam)
Perandoor Bhagavathy Temple (Perandoor Junction)
Puthukulangara Devi Temple (Near Patanjali Yoga Vidyapeetham, Perandoor Road, Elamakkara)
Mulakkal Devi Temple (Thannikkal, Swamipadi, Perandoor Road, Elamakkara)
Sree Bala Bhadra Devi Temple (Near Perandoor Junction, Elamakkara)
Punnakkal Bhagavathy Temple (Punnakkal Junction, Edappally Raghavan Pillai Road, Elamakkara)
Puthukkalavattom Sree Swayambhu Mahadeva Temple (Puthukklavattom Road, Elamakkara)
Chittoor Sri Krishna Temple (7 km from North Railway Station)
TD Temple Cochin (15 km from South Railway Station)
Edappally Krishna Temple (Opposite Changampuzha Park, Edappally)
 Maramkulangara Krishna Temple (Vennela-Thrippunithura Road)
Keraleswaram Temple, Mulavukadu

Mosques
 Kombara Juma Masjid, Kombara Jn., Ernakulam North, Ernakulam
 North Town Masjid, Opp. Specialists Hospital., Ernakulam North, Ernakulam
 Thevara Juma Masjid, Thevara., Ernakulam
 Thammanam Pallipady Ponnurunni Juma Masjid, Thammanam, Ernakulam
 Salafi Masjid, Vyttila Jn., Ernakulam
 Cutchi Hanafi Juma Masjid, Lobo Jn., Mattanchery, Ernakulam
 New Mosque, New Road, Mattanchery, Ernakulam
 Mahlara Juma Masjid, New Road Jn., Mattanchery, Ernakulam
 Ilayakovilakam Juma Masjid, Star Jn., Mattanchery, Ernakulam
 Hudha Masjid, New Road, Mattanchery, Ernakulam
 Amaravathy Juma Masjid, Amaravathy., Ernakulam
 Pattalam Juma Masjid, Pattalam, Fort Kochi, Ernakulam
 Pettah Juma Masjid, Main Road., Pettah Jn., Tripunithura, Ernakulam
 Juma Masjid, Tripunithura, Market Jn., Tripunithura, Ernakulam
 Madavana Juma Masjid, Madavana, Panangad Road, Ernakulam
 Kanjiramattom Juma Masjid, Kanjiramattom., Ernakulam

Churches
 Assemblies of God in India, Kakkanad
 Basilica of Our Lady of Snows, Pallippuram
 CSI Immanuel Church, Ernakulam
 Eloor St Gregorios Malankara Orthodox Church
 India Pentecostal Church of God, Fortkochi
 Kalamassery St George Malankara Orthodox Church
 Karingachira  Syrian Orthodox cathedral 
 Little Flower Church, Elamkulam
 Malankara Syriac orthodox theological Seminary Mulanthuruthy, Ernamkulam 
 Mar Yohannan Nepumsianose Syro-Malabar Catholic Church, Konthuruthy, which houses the tomb of Mar Varghese Payyappilly Palakkappilly
 Marthoman Cathedral, Mulanthuruthy
 Nadamel Marth Mariam Syrian Orthodox Church
 Padamukal St Johns Baptist Malankara Orthodox Church, Kakkanad
 Palarivattom St George  Malankara Orthodox Church
 Patriarch Ignatius Zaka I Iwas Syrian Orthodox Centre, puthencruz
 Salem Mar Thoma Church, Ernakulam
 St. Antony's Shrine, Kaloor
 St. Francis Assisi Cathecdral, Ernakulam
 St George Hebron  Syrian Orthodox Church
 St. George Syro-Malabar Catholic Forane Church, Edappally
 St Gregorios Malankara Orthodox church, Elamkulam 
 St.Joseph's Church, Vazhakala
 St. Jude Church, Karanakodam
 St. Marys Soonoro Patriarchal Cathedral Elamkulam, Kochi
 St. Mary's Soonoro Syrian Orthodox Cathedral, Elamkulam
 St. Mary's Syrian Orthodox Cathedral, Morakkala (Since AD 905)
 St. Mary's Syro-Malabar Catholic Cathedral Basilica, Ernakulam
 St. Mary's Orthodox Cathedral, Marine Drive,Ernakulam
 St.Michael's Church, Chembumukku
 St.Patrick's Church, Vytilla
 St.Raphael's Church, Thykoodam
 St. Thomas Evangelical Church of India
 St. Thomas Marthoma Church Kalamassery
 Thamarachal Valiyapally
 The Pentecostal Mission, Edappally
 Thevara St Thomas Malankara Orthodox Church
 Thripunithura St Gregorios Malankara Orthodox Chapel
 Vallarpadam Church Basilica of Our Lady of Ransom, Vallarpadam-Ernakulam
 Vettikal Dayara (First Dayara in Malankara Est. AD 1100) under Malankara Orthodox Church
 Vytila St Gregorios Malankara Orthodox Church

References

Religion in Ernakulam district